Israel–Vietnam relations (Hebrew: יחסי ישראל-וייטנאם; Vietnamese: Mối quan hệ giữa Israel và Việt Nam) refers to the bilateral relations between the State of Israel and the Socialist Republic of Vietnam. Vietnam and Israel established diplomatic relations on July 12, 1993, followed by Israel opening its resident embassy in Hanoi in December 1993. The current Vietnamese Ambassador to Israel is Lý Đức Trung, who has been assigned since April 2022. Ambassador Lý Đức Trung operates out of the Vietnamese embassy in Tel Aviv. The current Israeli Ambassador to Vietnam is Yaron Mayer, who has been assigned since August 2022. Ambassador Mayer operates out of the Israeli embassy in Hanoi.

Relations between the two nations are generally friendly and stable. Vietnam has expressed its interest in boosting defense ties with Israel. There are also many Vietnamese working in Israel, and Israel has also delivered humanitarian aid to Vietnam in several occasions. According to reports, some 2,000 Vietnamese students study in Israel. Israel and Vietnam also cooperate in such fields as agriculture, information technology and biotech, and cultural exchanges between the two countries are quite extensive. Vietnam is Israel's largest trading partner in Southeast Asia.

History
In 1946, future Israeli Prime Minister David Ben-Gurion and North Vietnam's Politburo chairman Ho Chi Minh stayed at the same hotel in Paris, and became very friendly.  Ho Chi Minh offered Ben Gurion a Jewish home-in-exile in Vietnam. Ben-Gurion turned the offer down, telling Ho Chi Minh: "I am certain we shall be able to establish a Jewish Government in Palestine."

From 1977 to 1979 the State of Israel permitted approximately 360 Vietnamese refugees to enter the country. The most well-known rescue operation took place on June 10, 1977 in which an Israeli freighter ship called the Yuvali, en route to Taiwan, sighted the passengers.

Vietnam and Israel established diplomatic relations on July 12, 1993. Israel opened its resident Embassy in Hanoi in December 1993, with David Matnai appointed as the first Ambassador to Vietnam.

The first resident Vietnamese ambassador to Israel was Đinh Xuân Lưu, who presented his credentials to Israeli President Shimon Peres on July 8, 2009. The ambassador operates out of an embassy at 4 Weizman Street in Tel Aviv, Israel, a first since the establishment of diplomatic relations in 1993. The previous ambassador was a non-resident ambassador, operating from Cairo. At their meeting, President Shimon Peres told the new ambassador: "I congratulate the Vietnamese government on their decision to establish an embassy in Israel. The establishment of an embassy opens a new era in the relationship of the two countries."

Since the establishment of diplomatic relations, the two countries have frequently conducted reciprocal visits at various levels, and have strengthened ties in such fields as business, education, culture, technological cooperation and agriculture. The visits arranged by the Israeli government included those of delegations comprising entrepreneurs and businessmen, academic groups, journalists, artists and musicians, legal workers, and so on.

In January 2010, Luu said that it was key for Israel to increase its cooperation with Vietnam via its strong wherewithal in high-potential high-tech areas such as information technology, aerospace, and biological technologies applied to agriculture to boost farming productivity, which were important areas in Vietnam's modernization. In September 2011, he and Vietnamese Ministry of Defence Deputy Minister Lieutenant General Truong Quang Khanh led a working delegation from the defense ministry in a visit to Israel.  In July 2012, he spoke of strong ties between Vietnam and Israel, and the possibilities for initiating future partnerships.

In November 2011, at the invitation of Vietnam's President Trương Tấn Sang, Israeli President Shimon Peres had an official visit to Vietnam from the 21st to the 27th, accompanied by Ministers and business delegation. This first high-ranking visit aimed at strengthening and expanding political and economic strategic ties between Israel and Vietnam.

In September 2012, Luu said that friendship and cooperation between Israel and Vietnam had its roots in a meeting in 1946 between Democratic Republic of Vietnam Prime Minister and President Ho Chi Minh and David Ben-Gurion.  He also said that trade between the two countries had risen to $660 million in the first eight months of 2012.  He spoke of cooperation between the two countries in agriculture, water technologies, IT, telecommunication, education, and homeland security.

Future president of Vietnam, Trần Đại Quang, visited Israel in 2014 and met with president Reuven Rivlin.

Israeli minister Tzipi Hotovely visited Vietnam in August 2015. Vietnamese deputy PM visited Israel on December of that year and met with prime minister Benjamin Netanyahu and other Israeli officials.

In 2016, Vietnamese deputy prime minister Vương Đình Huệ said Vietnam should learn from Israel how to develop a start-up ecosystem.

In October 2016, Vietnamese president Trần Đại Quang met with Israeli ambassador to Vietnam, Meirav Eilon Shahar, and praised the warm ties between the two countries. He further stated Israel and Vietnam need to boost their economic and business ties and to even open a direct route between them in order to facilitate their cooperation and tourism.

Public security minister of Vietnam, General To Lam visited Israel in November 2016 and met with Israeli prime minister Benjamin Netanyahu.

Receiving the credentials of the Vietnamese ambassador to Israel, Ly Duc Trung, in August 2022, Israeli President Isaac Herzog expressed his desire to expand Israeli-Vietnamese collaboration in the fields of trade, agriculture, innovation and more.

Economic relations

Israeli businessmen have shown considerable interest in Vietnam and organized many business trips to the country to explore investment opportunities in agriculture, aquaculture, tourism, oil and gas exploitation and production, telecommunications, and pharmacy. In August 2004, Israel and Vietnam signed an Agreement of Economic and Trade Cooperation, an important legal basis for the further development of trade. The two-way trade turnover has reached 70 million US dollars in 2005. Two Israeli corporations, Agronet and Astraco, have opened offices in Hanoi.

Technology and know-how developed at Kibbutz Afikim will be used in a half-a-billion-dollar milk production project in Vietnam. The project involves establishing a dairy of 30,000 cows to supply 500,000 liters of milk a day, about 40% of Vietnam's present milk consumption.  Afikim will be responsible for all stages of the enterprise, including breeding and preparing land for crops that will be used as feed.

The governments of Vietnam and Israel signed an agreement on double tax avoidance in Hanoi on August 4, 2009, creating a transparent and healthy legal environment for their businesses to increase transactions. Signatories to the document were Deputy Minister of Finance Tran Xuan Ha and Israeli Ambassador to Vietnam Effie Ben Matityau. They both stressed the importance of the agreement in promoting economic and trade cooperation between the two countries.  Israel and Vietnam are also working on completing a free-trade agreement, that would further enhance the business relationship between the two countries.

The Israeli government has helped train and educate Vietnamese in the science of agriculture, aquaculture, livestock,  and dairy milk production. Vietnam, which is now considered one of the leading economies in the developing world, relies part of its success on Israeli technology and agricultural development.

Military cooperation
Many Israeli military experts have been impressed by the development of the Vietnamese military and its equipment, which led to the Israeli Government and the Israel Defence Forces to develop deeper ties with the Vietnam People's Army. The first Israeli military mission to Vietnam was initiated in 2012–13. The Vietnamese Government continues to express interest for further cooperation, and even military exercises between the two countries. By 2020, Vietnam emerged as the main buyer of Israeli weapons and surveillance system alongside India and Azerbaijan, and is also the only Southeast Asian country to have an Israeli manufacturing weapon factory, which has caused condemnation and criticism in Israel due to Vietnam's human rights record.

Assistance to Vietnam
Israel has also dispatched many specialists to Vietnam to give in-service training to their Vietnamese colleagues, especially in agriculture. Government officials and professionals from various ministries in Vietnam have visited Israel to study tours as well as for trainings. Various on-the-spot courses have been conducted in various fields, such as agriculture, aquaculture, livestock, dairy milk production and education, under the auspices of MASHAV, the Israeli Center for International Cooperation.

Technology
A forum to further scientific and technological cooperation between Vietnam and Israel took place in Hanoi on January 18, 2010, drawing the participation of close to 160 businesses from both countries. Speaking at this first forum of its kind in Vietnam, Vice Chairman of the Vietnam  Chamber of Commerce and Industry (VCCI) Pham Gia Tuc, stated that the Vietnamese government sees Israel as an important partner in its policy to boost multi-faceted cooperation with countries in the Middle East.

In 2016, a group of Vietnamese students and teachers traveled to Israel to learn about robotics and start-ups.

Cultural ties

In 2014, Vietnam hosted an Israeli film festival, in celebration of 20 years of diplomatic relations between the two countries.

Numerous Israeli books have been translated to Vietnamese.

See also 
 Palestine–Vietnam relations
 History of the Jews in Vietnam
 International recognition of Israel
 United States–Vietnam relations

References

External links 
  Israeli embassy in Hanoi
  Vietnamese embassy in Tel Aviv

 
Vietnam
Bilateral relations of Vietnam